Cambridgeshire County Cricket Club was established on 6 June 1891; prior to that a county club had existed before, and had occasionally appeared in first-class cricket. It has since played minor counties cricket from 1895 and played List A cricket from 1964 to 2004, using a different number of home grounds during that time. Their first home minor counties fixture in 1895 was against Norfolk at Fenner's, Cambridge, while their first home List A match came 69 years later, against Essex in the 1964 Gillette Cup at Spicer's Sports Ground, Sawston.

The 21 grounds that Cambridgeshire have used for home matches since 1895 are listed below, with statistics complete through to the end of the 2014 season.

Grounds

List A
Below is a complete list of grounds used by Cambridgeshire County Cricket Club when it was permitted to play List A matches. These grounds have also held Minor Counties Championship and MCCA Knockout Trophy matches.

Minor Counties
Below is a complete list of grounds used by Cambridgeshire County Cricket Club in Minor Counties Championship and MCCA Knockout Trophy matches.

Notes

References

Cambridgeshire County Cricket Club
Cricket grounds in Cambridgeshire
Cambridgeshire